Łukowisko  ) is a village in the administrative district of Gmina Międzyrzec Podlaski, within Biała Podlaska County, Lublin Voivodeship, in eastern Poland.

The village has a population of 330.

References

Villages in Biała Podlaska County
Zakerzonia